Gottfried Becker may refer to:

 Gottfried Becker (born 1600) (1600–1652), rector
 Johann Gottfried Becker (1639–1711), German-Danish pharmacist
 Gottfried Becker (1681–1741) (1681–1750), Danish pharmacist
 Johan Gottfried Becker (born 1723) (1723–1790), Danish pharmacist
 Gottfried Becker (1767–1845), Danish pharmacist 
 Gottfried Wilhelm Becker (1778–1854), German physician and writer